Anton Lans (born 17 April 1991) is a Swedish footballer who plays for Örgryte IS as a defender.

References

External links
 
 

1991 births
Living people
Swedish footballers
Association football defenders
Allsvenskan players
Superettan players
IF Elfsborg players
Falkenbergs FF players
Gefle IF players
Örgryte IS players
People from Lidköping Municipality
Sportspeople from Västra Götaland County